Oviir is a surname. Notable people with the surname include:

Liisa Oviir (born 1977), Estonian lawyer and politician
Mihkel Oviir (born 1942), Estonian lawyer
Siiri Oviir (born 1947), Estonian politician and Member of the European Parliament

Estonian-language surnames